Singular may refer to:
 Singular, the grammatical number that denotes a unit quantity, as opposed to the plural and other forms
 Singular homology
 SINGULAR, an open source Computer Algebra System (CAS)
 Singular or sounder, a group of boar, see List of animal names
 Singular matrix, a matrix that is not invertible
 Singular measure, a measure or probability distribution whose support has zero Lebesgue (or other) measure
 Singular cardinal, an infinite cardinal number that is not a regular cardinal
 The property of a singularity or singular point in various meanings; see Singularity (disambiguation)
 Singular (band), a Thai jazz pop duo
Singular: Act I, a 2018 studio album by Sabrina Carpenter
Singular: Act II, a 2019 studio album by Sabrina Carpenter

See also
 Singulair, Merck trademark for the drug Montelukast
 Cingular Wireless, a mobile network operator in North America